In the organisation of the Catholic Church and of the Anglican Communion an ordinariate is a pre- or pseudo-diocesan ecclesiastical structure, of geographical or personal nature, headed by an ordinary who is not necessarily a bishop.

An ordinariate can be:

 an ordinariate for the faithful of eastern rites in one or more countries
 a military ordinariate, for the troops of a nation 
 a personal ordinariate, also known as the Catholic Ordinariate of the Anglican Patrimony
 a missionary jurisdiction, the Eastern Catholic equivalent of an apostolic prefecture, e.g. the former Ordinariate of Asmara
 the diocesan curia (in German use [Ordinariat], cf. English chancery)
 an ordinariate for an academic community, notably the former (unique?) Ordinariate for foreign students in Belgium

See also 

 List of Catholic dioceses (structured view)

References 

Catholic canonical structures